Atlantic Municipal Airport , is a city-owned public-use airport located two miles (3 km) west of the central business district of Atlantic, a city in Cass County, Iowa, United States. The airport has a runway opened in 2006 capable of handling light business jets.

It is included in the National Plan of Integrated Airport Systems for 2017–2021, which categorized it as a local general aviation facility.

Facilities and aircraft 
It has two runways: 2/20 is 5,000 by 75 feet (1,524 x 23 m) with a concrete surface and approved precision instrument approaches. 12/30 is 3,132 by 75 feet (955 x 23 m) with an asphalt surface.

For the 12-month period ending August 3, 2016, the airport had 8,050 aircraft operations, an average of 22 per day: all general aviation.
In December 2017, there were 23 aircraft based at this airport: 20 single-engine and 3 multi-engine.

See also
List of airports in Iowa

References

External links 
 Atlantic Municipal Airport from the Iowa DOT Aviation System Plan
 

Airports in Iowa
Transportation buildings and structures in Cass County, Iowa
Atlantic, Iowa